The 2009 Hockey Junior World Cup was the ninth tournament of the Hockey Junior World Cup. The tournament was co-hosted in both Johor Bahru, Malaysia and Singapore from June 7 to June 21, 2009. It was contested by 20 teams with Germany defeating Netherlands in the final to claim their fifth Junior World Cup title.

Teams
The teams were announced by the International Hockey Federation on November 12, 2008. The teams listed are sorted by the ranking obtained in each qualification tournament. The FIH released the pools on January 26, 2009, and the schedule on February 2, 2009.

Results
All times are Malaysia Time and Singapore Time (UTC+08:00)

Preliminary round

Pool A

Pool B

Pool C

Pool D

Medal round

Pool E

Pool F

Non-medal round

Pool G

Pool H

Pool I

Fifth to twentieth place classification

Nineteenth and twentieth place

Seventeenth and eighteenth place

Fifteenth and sixteenth place

Thirteenth and fourteenth place

Eleventh and twelfth place

Ninth and tenth place

Seventh and eighth place

Fifth and sixth place

First to fourth place classification

Semi-finals

Third and fourth place

Final

Awards

Statistics

Final standings

Goalscorers

References

External links
Official FIH website
Official website
ESPNStar.com coverage

Hockey Junior World Cup
J
F
Johor Bahru
F
International field hockey competitions hosted by Malaysia
International field hockey competitions hosted by Singapore
Men's Hockey